Morghan King is an American weightlifter who competed at the 2016 Olympics.

2013 season
At the 2013 World Weightlifting Championships she finished 11th.

2014 season
At the 2014 World Weightlifting Championships she finished 10th.  She also finished 4th at the 2014 Pan American Championships.

2015 season
King finished 4th at the 2015 Pan American Games.  She also finished 23rd at the 2015 World Weightlifting Championships.

2016 season
With a lift of 100 kg in the clean & jerk, over twice her body weight of 48 kg, King qualified for the 2016 Olympics.  At the Olympics she finished 6th.

References

Living people
American female weightlifters
Sportspeople from Seattle
Weightlifters at the 2016 Summer Olympics
Olympic weightlifters of the United States
1985 births
Weightlifters at the 2015 Pan American Games
Pan American Games competitors for the United States
21st-century American women